Mongolia competed at the 2020 Summer Paralympics in Tokyo, Japan, from 24 August to 5 September 2021.

Medalists

Competitors
The following is the list of number of competitors participating in the Games:

Archery 

Mongolia has entered one archer at Men's Individual Recurve Open.

Shooting

Mongolia entered one athletes into the Paralympic competition. Ganbaatar Zandraa successfully break the Paralympic qualification at the 2019 WSPS World Cup which was held in Al Ain, United Arab Emirates.

Taekwondo

Mongolia qualified two athletes to compete at the Paralympics competition. All of them qualified by finishing first at K44 category to booked one of six quotas.

References 

Nations at the 2020 Summer Paralympics
2020
2021 in Mongolian sport